Abhishek Manu Singhvi (born 24 February 1959) is an Indian lawyer and politician. As politician, he is a member of the Indian National Congress (INC) and a current Member of the Parliament of India representing West Bengal in the Rajya Sabha, the Upper House of the Indian Parliament. He is also a spokesperson for the INC. He is one of the senior advocates of the Supreme Court of India.

Early life
Singhvi was born in a Marwari family. His father Laxmi Mall Singhvi was a scholar in Jain history and culture. He was a renowned lawyer and India's former High Commissioner to the UK. He was elected to Rajya Sabha (1998–2004). His mother's name is Kamla Singhvi.

He completed his school from St. Columba's School. He obtained B.A.(Hons.), M.A., PhD, PIL educated at St. Stephen's College, Trinity College, Cambridge and Harvard University. Singhvi completed his PhD under constitutional lawyer Sir William Wade of Cambridge University. The topic of his doctoral dissertation at Cambridge University was on Emergency Powers.

Personal life
Singhvi is married to ghazal and Sufi singer Anita Singhvi. They have two sons.

Positions held
Singhvi, at 37, became the youngest Additional Solicitor General of India, in 1997. He held the position for a year, until 1998.

2001 onwards National Spokesperson, Indian National Congress

April 2006 Elected to Rajya Sabha

Aug. 2006 – May 2009 and Aug. 2009 – July 2011 Member, Committee on Personnel, Public Grievances, Law and Justice

Aug. 2006 – Aug. 2007 Member, Joint Committee on Offices of Profit Member, Joint Committee to examine the Constitutional and Legal position relating to Office of Profit Member, Consultative Committee for the Ministry of Urban Development

Sept. 2006 – Sept. 2010 Member, Committee of Privileges

July 2010 onwards Member, Consultative Committee for the Ministry of External Affairs

July 2011 onwards chairman, Committee on Personnel, Public Grievances, Law and Justice Member, General Purposes Committee.

July 2012 onwards Spokesman Congress Party.

Controversies

Sex Tape
A tape featuring Singhvi, a married man, having sex with a lawyer in his office was circulated wherein he allegedly promised to get her appointed as a judge. He categorically denied any "wrongdoing" while temporarily quitting party posts. Singhvi later settled a deal out of court with his driver who allegedly admitted to recording and circulating the video.

Income Tax Fine
In 2014, he was fined  57 crore by the Income Tax Settlement Commission for failing to furnish documents supporting his claims of expenditure for running his office.

References

External links
Abhishek Singhvi - Profile 
Profile on India.gov.in
Profile on Rajya Sabha website

1959 births
Marwari people
St. Stephen's College, Delhi alumni
Alumni of Trinity College, Cambridge
Fellows of Trinity College, Cambridge
Fellows of St John's College, Cambridge
Living people
Harvard University alumni
Indian National Congress politicians
Rajasthani politicians
People from Jodhpur
St. Columba's School, Delhi alumni
Rajya Sabha members from Rajasthan
Singhvi family
Supreme Court of India lawyers